Lament is an album by saxophonist Frank Morgan which was recorded in 1986 and released on the Contemporary label.

Reception

The review by Allmusic's Scott Yanow said: "Frank Morgan's comeback (he had gone 30 years between recordings) was a major story in the mid-1980s ... The music is high-quality bop, with Morgan shedding much of his Charlie Parker influence to display his own distinctive sound". In The New York Times, Robert Palmer wrote: "Mr. Morgan's new album Lament lets us know how much we've been missing. ... he plays with burning conviction, and with a fluidity that can be positively dazzling. The six tunes are well-chosen. ... Overall, this is a more impressive album than last year's very fine Easy Living. It seems that at age 53, Frank Morgan's time has finally come".

Track listing 
 "Ceora" (Lee Morgan) – 7:34
 "Until It's Time for You to Go" (Buffy Sainte-Marie) – 6:05
 "Perdido" (Juan Tizol) – 7:56
 "Ana Maria" (Wayne Shorter) – 6:57
 "Lament" (J. J. Johnson) – 9:17
 "Half Nelson" (Miles Davis) – 5:17
 "Thank You Blues" (Frank Morgan) – 8:08 Additional track on CD release

Personnel

Performance
Frank Morgan – alto saxophone
Cedar Walton – piano
Buster Williams – bass
Billy Higgins – drums

Production
Richard Bock – producer
Danny Kopelson – engineer

References 

Frank Morgan (musician) albums
1986 albums
Contemporary Records albums
Albums produced by Richard Bock (producer)